The Stop Online Piracy Act (SOPA) and the PROTECT IP Act (PIPA) are two proposed draft laws that were being considered by the United States Congress. Their stated goals are to increase the ability of U.S. law enforcement to fight online trafficking in copyrighted intellectual property and counterfeit goods, and give the U.S. government and copyright holders additional tools to curb access to "rogue websites dedicated to infringing or counterfeit goods", especially those registered outside the United States.

Supporters of the laws argued that they are needed to protect the intellectual property of owners of content. Opponents of the laws argued that they endanger free speech and free expression by harmfully regulating the internet.

Supporters of SOPA/PIPA

SOPA is the bill under consideration by the U.S. House of Representatives. PIPA is the related bill under consideration by the U.S. Senate.

SOPA Sponsors
The Stop Online Piracy Act was introduced by Representative Lamar Smith (R-TX).

Sponsors at introduction
SOPA was initially co-sponsored by 12 Representatives:

 Howard Berman (D-CA)
 Mary Bono Mack (R-CA)
 Steve Chabot (R-OH)
 John Conyers (D-MI)
 Ted Deutch (D-FL)
 Elton Gallegly (R-CA)
 Bob Goodlatte (R-VA)
 Adam Schiff (D-CA)
 Marsha Blackburn (R-TN)
 Timothy Griffin (R-AR)Withdrew Sponsorship 1/18/2012
 Dennis A. Ross (R-FL)Withdrew Sponsorship 1/18/2012The Rachel Maddow Show, Jan 18, 12
 Lee Terry (R-NE)Withdrew Sponsorship, 1/18/2012

Subsequent sponsors
After its initial introduction, other Representatives became co-sponsors of SOPA:

 Mark Amodei [R-NV2]
 Joe Baca [D-CA43]
 John Barrow [D-GA12]
 Karen Bass [D-CA33]
 John Carter [R-TX31]Withdrew Sponsorship 1/24/2012
 Judy Chu [D-CA32]
 Jim Cooper [D-TN5]
 Peter T. King [R-NY3]
 John Larson [D-CT1]
 Ben R. Luján [D-NM3]Withdrew Sponsorship 1/23/2012
 Thomas Marino [R-PA10]
 Alan Nunnelee [R-MS1]
 Bill Owens [D-NY23]
 Steve Scalise [R-LA1]Withdrew Sponsorship 1/23/2012
 Brad Sherman [D-CA27]
 Debbie Wasserman Schultz [D-FL20]
 Melvin Watt [D-NC12]
 Tim Holden [D-PA-17]Withdrew Sponsorship 1/18/2012
 Benjamin Quayle [R-AZ-3]Withdrew Sponsorship 1/17/2012

Senators who support PIPA

The Protect IP Act (PIPA) was introduced by Senator Patrick Leahy (D-VT). Senate Majority Leader Harry Reid planned to bring it to a vote on January 24. Reid rejected a request by six Senators for a postponement, saying "this is an issue that is too important to delay".

As of January 17, 2012, PIPA was co-sponsored by:

 Lamar Alexander (R-TN)
 Jeff Bingaman (D-NM)
 Richard Blumenthal (D-CT)
 Barbara Boxer (D-CA)
 Sherrod Brown (D-OH)
 Bob Casey, Jr. (D-PA)
 Saxby Chambliss (R-GA)
 Thad Cochran (R-MS)
 Chris Coons (D-DE)
 Bob Corker (R-TN)
 Dick Durbin (D-IL)
 Mike Enzi (R-WY)
 Dianne Feinstein (D-CA)
 Al Franken (D-MN)
 Kirsten Gillibrand (D-NY)
 Lindsey Graham (R-SC)
 Chuck Grassley (R-IA) Withdrawn 1/18/12
 Kay Hagan (D-NC)
 Johnny Isakson (R-GA)
 Tim Johnson (D-SD)
 Amy Klobuchar (D-MN)
 Herb Kohl (D-WI)
 Mary Landrieu (D-LA)
 Joseph Lieberman (I-CT)
 John McCain (R-AZ)
 Bob Menendez (D-NJ)
 Bill Nelson (D-FL)
 Jim Risch (R-ID)
 Chuck Schumer (D-NY)
 Jeanne Shaheen (D-NH)
 Tom Udall (D-NM)
 Sheldon Whitehouse (D-RI)

Opponents of SOPA/PIPA

Representatives opposed to SOPA/PIPA
In December 2011, Representative Ron Paul spoke out against SOPA, deriding it as a bill that would "take over the Internet". Paul thus became the first major presidential candidate to publicly oppose the SOPA.

Former SOPA supporters
 Benjamin Quayle (R-AZ) (withdrew Jan 18)
 Dennis A. Ross (R-FL) (withdrew Jan 18)
 Lee Terry (R-NE) (withdrew Jan 18)

Senators opposed to SOPA/PIPA

Sen. Ron Wyden was one of the opposition leaders against PIPA. On November 28, 2011, Wyden issued a filibuster threat with Sen. Jerry Moran if SOPA/PIPA made it to the floor. A January 20, 2012, editorial in the Daily Kos described Wyden as "The biggest SOPA/PIPA hero". After Senator Wyden, Senator Moran was one of the first Senators to recognize the problems with PIPA and to take a stand against the bill Massachusetts Senator Scott Brown (R) also publicly voiced his opposition to the legislation as well as its sister bill in the House, SOPA.

Opposition

 Ron Wyden (D-OR)
 Bernie Sanders (I-VT)
 Rand Paul (R-KY)
 Mark Warner (D-VA)
 Kelly Ayotte (R-NH)
 Mark Begich (D-AK)
 John Boozman (R-AR) Jan 18
 Scott Brown (R-MA)
 Maria Cantwell (D-WA)
 Tom Coburn (R-OK) Jan 18
 John Cornyn (R-TX)
 Jim DeMint (R-SC) Jan 18
 James Inhofe (R-OK)
 Mike Johanns (R-NE)
 Ron Johnson (R-WI)
 Mark Kirk (R-IL)
 Mike Lee (R-UT)
 Jeff Merkley (D-OR) Jan 18
 Lisa Murkowski (R-AK)
 Marco Rubio (R-FL)
 Olympia Snowe (R-ME)
 Pat Toomey (R-PA)

Former PIPA supporters

 Jerry Moran (R-KS) Withdrawn: 6/27/11
 Kelly Ayotte (R-NH) Withdrawn 1/18/12
 Roy Blunt (R-MO) Withdrawn 1/18/12
 Ben Cardin (D-MD) Withdrawn 1/18/12
 Orrin Hatch (R-UT) Withdrawn 1/18/12Sen. Hatch official statement on withdrawing support from PIPA.
 Marco Rubio (R-FL) Withdrawn 1/18/12
 David Vitter (R-LA) Withdrawn 1/18/12
 Chuck Grassley (R-IA) Withdrawn 1/18/12

Legislative narrative

Senate Judiciary Committee
In May 2011, the Senate Judiciary Committee unanimously voted to report in favor of PIPA.

 Patrick Leahy
 Herb Kohl
 Dianne Feinstein
 Chuck Schumer
 Richard Durbin
 Sheldon Whitehouse
 Amy Klobuchar
 Al Franken
 Chris Coons
 Richard Blumenthal
 Chuck Grassley
 Orrin Hatch
 Jon Kyl
 Jeff Sessions
 Lindsey Graham
 John Cornyn
 Mike Lee
 Tom Coburn
Source: 

However, Senator Ron Wyden (D-OR) placed a "Senate hold" on the bill, postponing it from going to a full floor vote.

U.S. Senate
On January 13, six Republican co-sponsors of the bill released a letter of concern, reading in part:

On January 17, Senator Ron Wyden announced his intention to filibuster PIPA if necessary.

January 18 saw the Internet Blackout protests in which websites coordinated to oppose SOPA/PIPA. In the wake of online protests, Senate Majority Leader Harry Reid announced that the PIPA vote previously scheduled for January 24 would be postponed.

SOPA in the House of Representatives
Representative Lamar S. Smith introduced SOPA. Smith remarked of the bill:

Legislative timeline
 May 12, 2011 – PIPA introduced to Senate
 May 26, 2011 – Senate Judiciary Committee unanimously votes to report in favor of PIPA
 Oct 26, 2011 – SOPA introduced to House
 Nov 16, 2011 – House Judiciary Committee hearing on SOPA
 Dec 15, 2011 – House markup on SOPA
 Jan 13, 2012 – Six PIPA Co-sponsors write letter of concern
 Jan 14, 2012 – White House issues formal response to SOPA/PIPA petition
 Jan 18, 2012 – Internet Blackout protest; 6 Senators withdraw support: Kelly Ayotte, John Boozman, Roy Blunt, Orrin Hatch, Mark Kirk, Marco Rubio. Two Representatives withdraw support: Benjamin Quayle, Lee Terry
 Jan 20, 2012 – Senate Majority Leader Reid announces vote on PIPA will be postponed
 Jan 24, 2012 – Senate vote on PIPA which was scheduled for this date has been postponed

See also
 List of organizations with official stances on the Stop Online Piracy Act

References

 ProPublica.org on PIPA
 ProPublica.org on SOPA

Internet access
United States federal computing legislation
Intellectual property legislation
Copyright enforcement
Internet law in the United States
SOPA PIPA
2011 in the United States
2012 in the United States
US Congresspersons who support or oppose SOPA PIPA